Otis Gene McDaniel III (born June 30, 1986) is an American sprinter who specializes in the 100 and 200 meters.

He won two gold medals at the 2005 Pan American Junior Athletics Championships, in the 200 meters and 4×100 meters relay.

A native of San Antonio, Texas, he attended William Howard Taft High School, where he was an All-American wide receiver. He committed to Texas Christian University on a football scholarship.

References

External links

TCU Horned Frogs track and field bio
TCU Horned Frogs football bio
Recruiting Profile at Rivals.com

1986 births
Living people
Players of American football from San Antonio
Track and field athletes from San Antonio
American male sprinters
American football wide receivers
TCU Horned Frogs football players